The Santa Rosa Hills are a low mountain range in the northern Peninsular Ranges System, in Riverside County, California.

They are located southeast of Hemet.

References 

Mountain ranges of Southern California
Peninsular Ranges
Mountain ranges of Riverside County, California